Petrus Willem van der Walt (born 6 January 1989 in Brits, North West) is a South African rugby union player who represents  at international level and is currently playing with NTT DoCoMo Red Hurricanes in the Japanese Top League. His regular position is lock or flanker.

Career

Youth
He then joined  and represented them at Under-19 and Under-21 levels between 2008 and 2010. He was also included in the  squad for the 2010 Varsity Cup, but never made an appearance.

Western Province

San Gregorio
In October 2011, he joined Italian National Championship of Excellence team San Gregorio and made sixteen appearances for them in the 2011–2012 season, but could not help stop them from finishing last in the table and getting relegated to Serie A1 in 2012–13.

Eastern Province Kings
He returned to South Africa a few months later and joined  for the 2012 Currie Cup First Division season. He made his debut on 30 July 2012 in the opening game of the season against .

Southern Kings
He was named in the  squad for the 2013 Super Rugby season.

NTT Docomo Red Hurricanes
He signed for Japanese Top League side NTT Docomo Red Hurricanes for the 2013–14 season, scoring two tries in 13 appearances.

Bulls

Return to NTT Docomo Red Hurricanes and representing Japan
After the Super Rugby season, he returned to the Hurricanes squad to ply his trade. He made his Test debut against Australia and made another two appearances in November. The South African born forward entered the 2019 Super Rugby season with 28 Super Rugby caps and 9 test caps for Japan. He cemented his place into the Japan's squad for the 2019 Rugby World Cup and has made 15 appearances for Japan heading into the quarter-finals of the tournament.

References

External links

South African rugby union players
Eastern Province Elephants players
Southern Kings players
Western Province (rugby union) players
Living people
1989 births
People from Brits, North West
Bulls (rugby union) players
Blue Bulls players
NTT DoCoMo Red Hurricanes Osaka players
Expatriate rugby union players in Italy
Expatriate rugby union players in Japan
South African expatriate sportspeople in Italy
South African expatriate sportspeople in Japan
South African expatriate rugby union players
Japan international rugby union players
Sunwolves players
Rugby union locks
Rugby union flankers
Rugby union number eights
Rugby union players from North West (South African province)
Urayasu D-Rocks players